is a Japanese voice actress who works for I'm Enterprise as of March 1, 2008. Her major roles are in anime shows and they include Yue Ayase in Negima, Fiore in Chrono Crusade, Alph in Nanoha, Michiru in Magikano, Suiseiseki in Rozen Maiden, Yae Shinatsuhiko in Yozakura Quartet and Sae Kawano in Yurumates.  In video games she voices Kasuga in Sengoku Basara.

Filmography

Anime
2001
 Kokoro Library (Usagi)
 Sister Princess (Karen)
 Najica Blitz Tactics (Kirara Mitsuboshi)
2002
 Kiddy Grade (Tweedledee)
 Getbackers (Himiko Kudou)
 Sister Princess: Re Pure (Karen)
2003
 Chrono Crusade (Florette "Fiore" Harvenheit)
 Scrapped Princess (Farfel)
 Dokkoida?! (Karen)
 The World of Narue (Rei Otonashi)
 Last Exile (Alistia Agrew)
2004
 Aqua Kids (Rio)
 Inuyasha (Shima)
 Girls Bravo (Lilica Stacy)
 Viewtiful Joe (Silvia)
 Futakoi (Koi Chigusa)
 Magical Girl Lyrical Nanoha (Alph)
 Maria Watches Over Us (Tomoko)
 Midori Days (Beniko Iwasaki)
 Rozen Maiden (Suiseiseki)
2005
 He Is My Master (Alicia)
 Solty Rei (Kasha Maverick)
 Transformers: Cybertron (Chromia)
 Futakoi Alternative (Koi Chigusa)
 Onegai My Melody (Chumi)
 PetoPeto-san (Kiyomi Akazawa)
 Magical Girl Lyrical Nanoha A's (Alph)
 Mahou Sensei Negima! (Yue Ayase)
 Rozen Maiden: Träumend (Suiseiseki)
2006
 Ouran High School Host Club (Kanako Kasugazaki)
 Canvas 2: Niji Iro no Sketch (Nanoha)
 Sgt. Frog (Chiroro)
 The Melancholy of Haruhi Suzumiya (Ryoko Asakura)
 Strawberry Panic! (Yaya Nanto)
 Negima!? (Yue Ayase)
 Magikano (Michiru Mamiya)
 Lovedol ~Lovely Idol~ (Toko Yuki)
 Rozen Maiden: Ouvertüre (Suiseiseki)
2007
 Hell Girl: Two Mirrors (Kiyo)
 Shonen Onmyouji (Tenko)
 Sketchbook ~full color'S~ (Fū Himuro)
 My Bride Is a Mermaid (Maki)
 Magical Girl Lyrical Nanoha StrikerS (Lutecia, Arf, Auris, Sette)
2008
 Special A (Sakura Ushikubo)
 Pocket Monsters: Diamond & Pearl (Haru)
 Yozakura Quartet (Yae Shinatsuhiko)
2009
 InuYasha: The Final Act (Mujina)
 Kiddy Girl-and (Tweedledee)
 Clannad After Story (Kimura)
 Saki (Satomi Kanbara)
 Hell Girl: Three Vessels (Yuki Miyajima)
 Sengoku Basara: Samurai Kings (Kasuga)
2010
 Sengoku Basara: Samurai Kings 2 (Kasuga)
 Hidamari Sketch × Hoshimittsu (Kuwahara, Trinity Azusa)
 Yumeiro Pâtissière (Mika Chinen)
2011
 Hidamari Sketch × SP (Kuwahara)
 Freezing (Miyabi Kannazuki)
 Mayo Chiki! (Maria)
 Future Diary (Ai Mikami)
 Last Exile: Fam, The Silver Wing (Alister Agrew)
2012
 Arashi no Yoru ni: Himitsu no Tomodachi (Lily)
 Saki Episode of Side A (Satomi Kanbara)
 Horizon in the Middle of Nowhere Season 2 (William Cecil, F. Walsingham)
 Tanken Driland (Lina)
 Hidamari Sketch × Honeycomb (Kuwahara)
 Busou Shinki (Mary Takigawa Celes)
 Persona 4: The Animation (Sayoko Uehara)
 Yurumates3Dei (Sae Kawano)
 Yurumates3Dei Plus (Sae Kawano)
2013
 Yozakura Quartet: Hana no Uta (Yae Shinatsuhiko)
 Rozen Maiden: Zurückspulen (Suiseiseki)
2014
 Saki - The Nationals (Satomi Kanbara)
 Jinsei (Nanako Mikami)
 Sengoku Basara: End of Judgement (Kasuga)
 Hamatora (Misty)
2015
 Charlotte (Yusa's Mother)
 The Disappearance of Nagato Yuki-chan (Ryoko Asakura)
 Magical Girl Lyrical Nanoha ViVid (Lutecia Alpine)
2016
 ViVid Strike! (Lutecia Alpine)
 Detective Conan (Kumi Suda)
 Schwarzesmarken (Suzy Cave)
 Handa-kun (Emi Handa)
2017
 Blue Exorcist: Kyoto Saga (Satoru's mother)
 Sakura Quest (Kiyomi Hīragi)
2018
 Hugtto! PreCure (Sumire Nono)
 One Piece (Gerth)
 Free: Dive to the Future (Young Ikuya Kirishima)
2019
 Demon Slayer: Kimetsu no Yaiba (Rui's Mother)

Theatrical animation
 The Disappearance of Haruhi Suzumiya (2010) – Ryōko Asakura
 Negima! Anime Final (2011) – Yue Ayase
 Sengoku Basara: The Last Party (2011) – Yumekichi

Original video animation (OVA)
 Love Hina Again (2002) – Kanako Urashima
 Memories Off 5 the Animation (2006) – Kazuki Mishima
 Negima! Shiroki Tsubasa Ala Alba (2008) – Yue Ayase
 Negima! Mo Hitotsu no Sekai (2009) – Yue Ayase
 Tenchi Muyo! War on Geminar (2009) – Chiaia Furan
 Yozakura Quartet ~Hoshi no Umi~ (2010) – Yae Shinatsuhiko
 Baby Princess (2011) – Mama
 The Beheading Cycle: The Blue Savant and the Nonsense Bearer (2016) – Akari Chiga

Video games
 Devil Kings (Kasuga)
 Fire Emblem: Akatsuki no Megami (Micaiah)
 Fire Emblem Heroes and Fire Emblem Engage (Micaiah)
 Hyperdimension Neptunia (Gust)
 Hyperdimension Neptunia Mk2 (Gust)
 La Pucelle: Tactics (Éclair)
 Lovely Idol (Tōko Yuki)
 Mugen no Frontier: Super Robot Wars OG Saga (Dorothy Mistral, Henne Valkyria)
 Sengoku Basara 2 (Kasuga)
 Sengoku Basara 4 (Kasuga)
 Sengoku Basara: Samurai Heroes (Kasuga)
 Sengoku Basara X (Kasuga)
 Triggerheart Exelica Enhanced (Faintear Imitate)
 True Love Story: Summer Days, and yet... (Kusunose Hina 楠瀬緋菜)
 Umineko: When They Cry (Furudo Erika)

References

 Taniguchi, Hiroshi et al. "The Official Art of Canvas2 ~Nijiiro no Sketch~". (November 2006) Newtype USA. pp. 101–107.

External links
  
 Official agency profile 
 Natsuko Kuwatani at the Seiyuu database
 

1978 births
Living people
Voice actresses from Tokyo Metropolis
People from Ōme, Tokyo
Japanese voice actresses
Japanese video game actresses
Singers from Tokyo
21st-century Japanese women singers
21st-century Japanese singers
Arts Vision voice actors
I'm Enterprise voice actors
Prits members